136P/Mueller, also known as Mueller 3, is a periodic comet in the Solar System.

References

External links 
 Orbital simulation from JPL (Java) / Horizons Ephemeris
 136P/Mueller 3 – Seiichi Yoshida @ aerith.net
 136P at Kronk's Cometography

Periodic comets
0136
136P
Comets in 2007
Comets in 2016
19900924